Tamm is a surname. 

"Tamm" is one of the most common surnames in Estonia. The word "tamm" in Estonian means "oak". 

People with the surname Tamm include:
Aino Tamm (1864–1945), Estonian singer and pedagogue
Aldo Tamm (born 1953), Estonian politician
Alex Matthias Tamm (born 2001), Estonian footballer 
Edward Allen Tamm (1906–1985), American FBI agent and federal judge (brother of Quinn Tamm)
Fabian Tamm (1879–1955), Swedish admiral
Hugo Tamm (1903–1990), Swedish diplomat
Igor Tamm (1895–1971), Soviet physicist, 1958 Nobel Prize for Physics
Ilmar Tamm (born 1972), Estonian Brigadier General
Jaak Tamm (1950–1999), Estonian politician and businessman
Joonas Tamm (born 1992), Estonian footballer
Jüri Tamm (1957–2021), Estonian hammer thrower
Kiiri Tamm (born 1962), Estonian actress 
Kristjan Tamm (born 1998), Estonian tennis player
Mary Tamm (1950–2012), British actress
Peter Tamm (1928-2016), German journalist and collector
Quinn Tamm (1910–1986), American FBI agent and jurist (brother of Edward Allen Tamm)
Raivo E. Tamm (born 1965) Estonian actor 
Ralph Tamm (born 1966), American football player
Reimo Tamm (born 1984), Estonian basketball player
Riin Tamm (born 1981), Estonian geneticist
Sebastian Tamm (1889–1962), Swedish rower
Tarmo Tamm (born 1953), Estonian politician
Thomas Tamm (born 1952), American whistleblower
Tiit Tamm (born 1952), Estonian ski jumper and coach
Väino Tamm (1930–1986), Estonian interior designer and professor
Viking Tamm (1896–1975), Swedish Army officer

External links

Estonian-language surnames